Philippodexia is a genus of parasitic flies in the family Tachinidae.

Species
Philippodexia longipes Townsend, 1926
Philippodexia montana (Townsend, 1926)
Philippodexia pallidula Mesnil, 1953
Philippodexia sumatrensis Townsend, 1926

References

Dexiinae
Diptera of Asia
Tachinidae genera
Taxa named by Charles Henry Tyler Townsend